The 1974–75 NBA season was the 29th season of the National Basketball Association. The season ended with the Golden State Warriors winning the NBA Championship, sweeping the Washington Bullets 4 games to 0 in the NBA Finals.

Notable occurrences
The New Orleans Jazz became the league's 18th franchise. 
The 1975 NBA All-Star Game was played at Arizona Veterans Memorial Coliseum in Phoenix, Arizona, with the East beating the West 108–102. Walt Frazier of the New York Knicks won the game's MVP award.
The NBA Playoffs were expanded from four teams per conference to five teams, adding another round to the playoffs consisting of a best-of-three series between the Nos. 4 and 5 seeds in each conference, with the winner earning the right to play the No. 1 seed in the conference semifinals. 
The Capital Bullets were renamed the Washington Bullets.
The Los Angeles Lakers miss the playoffs for the first time since their 1960 move to Southern California.
The Milwaukee Bucks also miss the playoffs for the first time since their inaugural season and also marked Kareem Abdul-Jabbar's last season with the Bucks before being traded to the Lakers, following the season.
Legendary referee Mendy Rudolph was forced to retire after suffering a blood clot in one of his lungs during a playoff game between the Buffalo Braves and Washington Bullets. Rudolph officiated more than 2,400 games over 24 seasons and worked the NBA World Championship Series every season from 1955 through 1974. Rudolph was enshrined in the Naismith Basketball Hall of Fame in 2007.

Season recap
The Warriors, with a record of 48–34, had low expectations against the Boston Celtics and the Bullets, both whom finished with records of 60–22.

At the start of the 1974–75 season, the Warriors underwent numerous roster changes, trading away Nate Thurmond for Clifford Ray, a first-round draft pick and $500,000 cash, which was the original motive of the trade.  This led some sports writers to predict the Warriors would not even make the playoffs.

Drafting Keith Wilkes (rookie of the year) proved a master stroke as many questioned his ability to handle the rigors of play in the NBA.  His play along with finals MVP Rick Barry, (First Team All NBA) and supported by such players as Clifford Ray, Butch Beard and the rest of an able supporting cast, proved to be enough to combat the tough and flashy Bullets, who had a very balanced and strong team with the likes of Wes Unseld, Kevin Porter and Elvin Hayes.

Until 2015, this was the only championship won by the Warriors in the San Francisco Bay area.

The defending champion Boston Celtics were the topic of much discussion as the season started. The team had upset Milwaukee and super giant Kareem Abdul-Jabbar a year ago, bringing the team full circle from the days of Bill Russell. Cowens was second again in rebounds while scoring over 20 points per game.  The Celtics roared to 60 wins this year, despite losing Dave Cowens with a broken foot at the 65-game mark. Jo Jo White was right there with the two stars in scoring, while Paul Silas continued his solid tradition of rebounding. Reserve Don Nelson, the future coaching great, shot just often enough to lead the NBA in accuracy from the floor. Boston's ability to outrebound and outpass teams led to many of those wins. 
The NBA's other 60-win team was the Washington Bullets. The team had a different name for the third straight year, but the same core of players. Elvin Hayes and Phil Chenier were the scorers, while Wes Unseld led the NBA in rebounds. Kevin Porter, a 6-foot fleet splinter, led the league in assists and foulouts and became a key part of the club. Even Mike Riordan, the discarded Knick, paid some dividends at forward. With Cowens battling injuries, they became a popular favorite in the East. Hayes, in particular, turned in another All-Pro caliber season as a leading rebounder and shot blocker. His inside defense, in combination with Unseld, created a lot of missed shots for opponents.
While the NBA boasted two 60-win giants this year, no other team won over 50 games, a surprising fact. Nine teams did win 40 games or more to show the rising balance of the league. The best of these were Buffalo, Golden State and Chicago.

Atlantic 
Buffalo supplanted New York as Boston's most serious rival in the Atlantic foursome with 49 wins. Buffalo boasted high-scoring super star Bob McAdoo. The Big Mac posted a 34.5 scoring average to lead the NBA, making more field goals than any other player. He also led in minutes played, while also ranking among the best rebounders and shot blockers in the league. The 6'10 220-pounder was threatening enough to also earn 798 free throw tries, another league high, converting a solid 81%. The Braves lost sensation Ernie DiGregorio to knee injury, watched former Laker Jim McMillian battle illness, and also lost Gar Heard for 25 games, which dropped the team from the elite and put more of the load on their star. This dimmed hopes for the playoffs.

This would be the high-water mark for the Braves franchise in Buffalo. The franchise left Buffalo to become the San Diego Clippers in 1978 and would not reach the 50-win mark until 2012–13, by which time the Clippers were in their 29th season in Los Angeles and 35th overall in Southern California.

Pacific 
Golden State  boasted the top-scoring offense in the league at 108.5 points per game to win the Pacific five and 48 games. Rick Barry turned in one of his greatest seasons ever to score 30.6 points per game, trying even more shots than McAdoo. Barry sank 90% of his free throws with his unique underhand delivery and finished sixth in the NBA in assists.  But Barry may have shocked most by leading the NBA in steals as well, using surprisingly quick hands while playing passing lanes as well as any forward ever. Criticized in the past, Barry's season was such that many writers believed Barry, not Cowens, Hayes or McAdoo, to be the NBA's true MVP this year. The playoffs would tell more of that story.

Central 
The Washington Bullets led by Elvin Hayes and Wes Unseld won 60 games, a tie with the Boston Celtics for first in the league and the Houston Rockets led by Calvin Murphy and Rudy Tomjanovich reached their first season at .500 as well as made the playoffs for the first time in Houston and second in franchise history.

Midwest 
The Chicago Bulls won 47 games to capture their first-ever division title. As usual, Chicago did it with a stifling defense that began with guards Jerry Sloan and Norm Van Lier. Holdout Bob Love missed 20 games but again led in scoring while signee Nate Thurmond got into the defense at center. The 33-year-old gave the team a needed rebounder while ranking third in the NBA in blocked shots.

The defending Western Conference champion Milwaukee Bucks suffered a precipitous decline following the retirement of Oscar Robertson, dropping from 59 wins in '73–'74 to 38 in '74–'75. This would be the final season in Wisconsin for Kareem Abdul-Jabbar, who forced a blockbuster trade during the summer of 1975 to the Lakers.

With the Bucks in the doldrums, it fell to Kansas City–Omaha to challenge Chicago for division supremacy. Nate Archibald responded by averaging 26.5 points per game, while Sam Lacey was a force in the paint with 11.4 rebounds a contest.

Playoffs 
Seven NBA teams out of 17 finished over .500, but three teams, New York, Cleveland and Detroit, also had 40–42 records. 
Boston drew a young 41–41 Houston team who had just won their first playoff series in franchise history against the Knicks 2–1. The Rockets had 20-point scorers Calvin Murphy and Rudy T. but little rebounding, and the veteran Celtics got past the Rockets 4–1 and into the Conference Finals once again. The much tougher East bracket was Washington, who had the same record Boston had, against the tough Buffalo Braves. Hayes vs. MacAdoo was the marquee matchup. But the Braves, who had traded Bob Kauffman, did not have the help for their star. Despite that, the series went the full seven in impressive fashion before the Bullets won to advance. Randy Smith played well in place of Ernie D, but not enough to turn the series the other way.
Out West, Golden State, still under the radar with many, met a solid Seattle team. Spencer Haywood, the SuperSonics' outspoken star, struggled with illnesses much of this year. Rookie center Tom Burleson and bombing guard Fred Brown picked up Haywood's slack with 20-point averages from the passes of guard Slick Watts, their first defender. But a 124–100 wipeout loss in Game Five put the writing on the wall as the Warriors advanced.
Chicago drew a very good Kansas City team that had bounced back from the bad Bob Cousy days under coach Phil Johnson. Nate Archibald was their star at just 5'11. But the Bulls guards hounded Nate the Skate to just 36% shooting in the series. Bob Love also schooled rookie forward Scott Wedman as the Bulls won 4–2. 
The anticipated monster clash of Boston-Washington was set, with DC native Red Auerbach in the shadows. Cowens and Hayes each turned in very strong performances, but did not guard each other. Havlicek and White joined Cowens as 20-point Celtic scorers. But somehow the Celtics lost three of the first four ballgames anyway. The inside defense of the Bullets, combined with plenty of free throws, allowed Washington to send the vaunted world champions home.
For some, this was a title in itself. But there was still one more round to play.
Most experts now expected Chicago to finally get their hard-earned shot in a classic offense vs. defense series against Golden State. Plus, Thurmond was seeking revenge against his old team, which now had 6'10 Cliff Ray, a former Bull and a lesser center, in his former Warrior center spot. The series would be a full seven-game barnburner. The Bulls used a 90–89 Game Two win to start a 2–1 advantage.  Golden State bounced back to win Game 4  but the Bulls won Game 5, making it 3–2. The Warriors cranked it up to win Game Six 86–72 in Chicago to force Game Seven at home. Bulls coach, Dick Motta, was giving most of the center minutes to rebounder Tom Boerwinkle, not Thurmond. With no bench scoring and Thurmond playing an average of just 20 minutes per game, The Warriors wiggled off the hook to win the game 83–79 and the series, 4–3. It was a hard loss for Bulls fans who had pulled for their team all decade.

Finals 
Washington-Golden State did not have the sizzle that Boston-Golden State would have had in the eyes of some. But then the Bullets, still glowing from their win over Boston, barely showed up anyway. The Warriors won Game 1 on the road 101–95, then won Games 2 and 3 at home, 92–91 and 109–101, respectively. Washington fans now expected the Bullets to come out blazing, and for Hayes and Unseld to take over the paint. Rookie Keith Wilkes, the local UCLA favorite, was quietly having a strong playoffs at power forward. He was listed at 6'7 and 190 pounds, and was opposite the 6'10 240-pound Hayes. Barry and Wilkes were the only Warriors scorers over 15 points per game in the series, and two Warriors starters averaged less than 10 points per game. However, Game 4 was a one-point win, 96–95, and the Warriors pulled a remarkable sweep to win the series 4–0.
Wilt Chamberlain had never won the title as a Warrior center, but now Cliff Ray had in his first try. Rick Barry averaged 28 points to be the star, but coach Al Attles' team had hustled and sweated throughout to key one of the most unusual and impressive championships ever.

Final standings

By division

By conference

Notes
z- Clinched Conference  
y – division champions
x – clinched playoff spot

Playoffs

Statistics leaders

NBA awards
Most Valuable Player: Bob McAdoo, Buffalo Braves
Rookie of the Year: Keith Wilkes, Golden State Warriors
Coach of the Year: Phil Johnson, Kansas City-Omaha Kings

All-NBA First Team:
F – Rick Barry, Golden State Warriors
F – Elvin Hayes, Washington Bullets
C – Bob McAdoo, Buffalo Braves
G – Nate Archibald, Kansas City-Omaha Kings
G – Walt Frazier, New York Knicks

All-NBA Second Team:
F – John Havlicek, Boston Celtics
F – Spencer Haywood, Seattle SuperSonics
C – Dave Cowens, Boston Celtics
G – Phil Chenier, Washington Bullets
G – Jo Jo White, Boston Celtics

All-NBA Rookie Team:
Scott Wedman, Kansas City-Omaha Kings
Tommy Burleson, Seattle SuperSonics
Keith Wilkes, Golden State Warriors
Brian Winters, Los Angeles Lakers
John Drew, Atlanta Hawks

NBA All-Defensive First Team:
John Havlicek – Boston Celtics
Paul Silas – Boston Celtics
Kareem Abdul-Jabbar- Milwaukee Bucks
Jerry Sloan – Chicago Bulls
Walt Frazier – New York Knicks

NBA All-Defensive Second Team:
Elvin Hayes – Washington Bullets
Bob Love – Chicago Bulls
Dave Cowens – Boston Celtics
Norm Van Lier – Chicago Bulls
Don Chaney – Boston Celtics

See also
1975 NBA Finals
1975 NBA playoffs
1974–75 ABA season

References